Seaford Court Estates Ltd v Asher [1949] 2 KB 481 is a case English law concerning interpretation of an Act of Parliament.

Judgment
Denning LJ held that the Act should be interpreted according to the mischief that Parliament was attempting to remedy, with consideration of the social conditions that prevailed at the time.

See also
Heydon's case
Pepper v Hart
Re Spectrum Plus Ltd

Notes

References

1949 in case law
Court of Appeal (England and Wales) cases
Statutory law
1949 in British law
Lord Denning cases